Knickerbocker Historic District is a national historic district located at Altoona, Blair County, Pennsylvania.  The district includes 153 contributing rowhouse buildings in a residential area of Altoona.  The buildings were primarily built between 1903 and 1930, as affordable worker's housing and reflect a number of popular architectural styles including Colonial Revival and Classical Revival.  The buildings feature decorative parapets, bay windows, porch posts, pediments, and a variety of ornamentation.  The district is visually dominated by the former Knikerbocker Hotel (c. 1906).

It was added to the National Register of Historic Places in 2002.

References

External links

Historic American Buildings Survey in Pennsylvania
Historic districts on the National Register of Historic Places in Pennsylvania
Neoclassical architecture in Pennsylvania
Colonial Revival architecture in Pennsylvania
Historic districts in Blair County, Pennsylvania
National Register of Historic Places in Blair County, Pennsylvania